Cumin is a surname. Notable people with the surname include:

William Cumin (?– 1159), Bishop of Durham and Lord Chancellor of Scotland
William Cumin (obstetrician)  (?–1854), Professor of Obstetrics and Gynaecology at the University of Glasgow

See also
Comyn (surname)